Birdie & Bogey is a 2004 Christian drama film directed by Mike Norris and starring Janine Turner, Mike Norris, Sheree J. Wilson, Carey Scott and Amanda Alch. It was released on November 17, 2004 by EMI CMG Distribution. The DVD, which contains "The Making Of", "Trailers", and "Commentary" bonus features,  is now available at national retailers from EMI CMG Distribution.

Premise 
Danny O'Connor chooses his daughter, Birdie, as his caddie. At first, the golfing association is shocked, but when Danny starts to win, the world takes notice. Danny has a chance to play in the PGA Tour. Just when his position on the Tour seems secure, Birdie's life is threatened with a deadly disease. Without his daughter's inspiration, Danny must find a way to compete alone, and fulfill his daughter's dying wish.

Production 
Shooting of Birdie & Bogey began in 2003.

References

External links 
 
 

2004 films
Films about evangelicalism
Golf films
2004 drama films
Pure Flix Entertainment films
2000s English-language films